Dance for the Sun, Yoga Songs for Kids, is the self-released 2006 debut album by Kira Willey.

Background
Willey initially began writing music in the forms of lullabies to her daughter. After a few years passed, she started playing the guitar, writing more often, and had begun teaching Yoga classes in New York City to children. The songs for Dance for the Sun were written with her class in mind, and after building up a collection, Willey began using these songs as a musical guide to complement her class, and received positive feedback from both her daughter and her class. When recording the album, Willey enlisted the help of her brother for bass vocals, her cousin for percussion and production, and several of the children in her class to provide vocals, nicknamed the "OmGirls". Dance for the Sun was released on December 1, 2006, in Philadelphia, Pennsylvania.

The album is primarily 15 tracks, the ones which appear first. The remainder are bonus tracks, which are of live recordings in her Yoga class that include children singing along and participating. The booklet contains educational illustrations of Yoga positions and poses that coincide with the bonus tracks.

The song "Colors" was popularized by its use in a Dell computers commercial, called "Portraits". The 31-second commercial showcased the company's laptop model, which featured casing in a variety of colors, presumably to match an aspect of the owner or their personality. This was part of a campaign that Dell ran, which asked consumers "What's your color?".

Review

Among critics of children's music, Dance for the Sun has received positive reviews, but it is said to be enjoyable by listeners of any age, and in the August 2007, Cookie Magazine said that Dance for the Sun was "joyful, upbeat, and eminently danceable. Willey’s vocals have a breezy coffeehouse quality that will appeal to listeners young and old alike."

Dance for the Sun has won several awards; an Independent Music Award for Best Children's Album, as well as a 2008 Parent's Choice Award. The track Caterpillar Caterpillar has also won an Independent Music Award and a Children's Music Web Award for Best Song.

Track listing

Information on track listing.

Personnel
Kira Willey - lead vocals, guitar and violin
Beau Lisy - drums and percussion
Matthew Charboneau - bass
Christopher Burge - saxes & flute
Information on personnel.

Awards

Album

Songs

References

Sources

External links
Fireflies Yoga, Official Website of Kira Willey
Dell Commercial featuring "Colors"

2006 debut albums